Rhizopogon truncatus is an ectomycorrhizal fungus in the family Rhizopogonaceae. It was described by American mycologist David Hunt Linder in 1924.

References

External links

Rhizopogonaceae
Fungi described in 1924
Fungi of North America